"Reasons" is a love ballad by Earth, Wind & Fire from their sixth studio album, That's the Way of the World. The song features the falsetto singing on lead vocals of Philip Bailey.

The ballad is considered a love song by listeners and fans and as such, is often played at weddings - a fact that surprised band members, since the song and lyrics tell a story about a one-night stand ("Longing to love you, just for a night"). After the couple makes love, disillusionment strikes. ("After the love game has been played / All our illusions were just a parade / And all our reasons have to fade.")

Critical reception
Alex Henderson of AllMusic called Reasons "a gorgeous ballad". When reviewing the album, Rolling Stone'''s Gordon Fletcher described the song as among their ballads cut from The Four Tops/Tavares mold. Over twenty years later, one album guide described it as one of the group's seminal hits.

Reel Tight version

During 1999 R&B group Reel Tight released a cover of Reasons as a single on G-Funk Records. The song reached No. 22 on the Billboard Adult R&B Songs chart.

Overview
Reel Tight's version of Reasons was produced by Larry Dunn and executively produced by Warren G.

Other covers and samples
"Reasons" has also been covered by artists such as The Manhattans on The Manhattans (1976), Miki Howard on Love Confessions (1987), Maxi Priest on Maxi, and Nelson Rangell on Far Away Day (2000). Musiq Soulchild also covered the song on the 2007 Earth, Wind & Fire tribute album, Interpretations: Celebrating the Music of Earth, Wind & Fire and Omarion on his 2017 album Reasons.

Reasons has been sampled by Master P on Intro/17 Reasons featured on his album 99 Ways to Die and by Shabba Ranks on the song "Muscle Grip" from his album X-tra Naked. The song was also sampled by Bone Thugs-N-Harmony on "Budsmokers Only" from their LP E 1999 Eternal, by Cam'ron on "More Reasons" from his album Purple Haze, and by E-40 on "Seasoned" from his album Charlie Hustle: The Blueprint of a Self-Made Millionaire''.

References

Earth, Wind & Fire songs
1975 singles
Songs written by Philip Bailey
Songs written by Maurice White
Rhythm and blues ballads
1970s ballads
Soul ballads
Songs written by Charles Stepney
Maxine Nightingale songs